"Konobar" ("Waiter") is the first single recorded and released by the Serbian new wave band Električni Orgazam. It was released in 1981 by Jugoton. The song also appeared on the band's debut album and several various artists compilations. The track is actually the first ever song written by the band.

History 

Hipnotisano Pile members gathered one evening in the "Mornar" Kafana in Belgrade and decided to form one more band. The band would feature Hipnotisano Pile members but they would play different instruments. The lead vocalist was chosen to be Srdjan Gojkoviċ Gile who was the band's drummer. The first appearance the band was to have at Palilula Guitar festival, so the band had to write and prepare some material within a month. The first song "Konobar" was written that evening by Ljubomir Đukić while they were waiting for the waiter to come.

Having participated in the Paket aranžman project with Idoli and Šarlo Akrobata, the band started preparing their debut album and the only single from the record was chosen to be "Konobar". For the B-side the band chose to record a cover version of The Beatles' track I've Got a Feeling. A different mix of the song appeared on the debut album.

The track was later included on a Jugoton compilation Svi marš na ples!. Live version of the song also appeared on several of the band's live releases.

Track listing 

 "Konobar" (Ljubomir Đukić) (2:08)
 "I've Got a Feeling" (Lennon/McCartney) (2:23)

Personnel 

 Srđan Gojković (guitar, vocals)
 Ljubomir Đukić (organ, piano, vocals)
 Marina Vulić (bass)
 Branko Kuštrin (drums)
 Ljubomir Jovanović (guitar)

External links and references 

 
 Konobar at Discogs
 EX YU ROCK enciklopedija 1960-2006,  Janjatović Petar;  

Električni Orgazam songs
1981 singles
1981 songs
Jugoton singles